Eric Alvin Bell (born October 27, 1963) is a retired professional baseball pitcher in Major League Baseball from 1985 to 1993. 

He is a 1982 graduate of Beyer High School in Modesto, California. 

He played with the Cleveland Indians, Baltimore Orioles, and Houston Astros.

References

External links

1963 births
Living people
Major League Baseball pitchers
Baseball players from California
Cleveland Indians players
Baltimore Orioles players
Houston Astros players
Canton-Akron Indians players
Hagerstown Suns players
Buffalo Bisons (minor league) players
Colorado Springs Sky Sox players
Bluefield Orioles players
Charlotte O's players
Newark Orioles players
Rochester Red Wings players
Tucson Toros players